Amalda turgida is a species of sea snail, a marine gastropod mollusk in the family Ancillariidae.

Description

Distribution
The distribution of this species is only know from the type locality, which is off Esperanee, south Western Australia.

References

turgida
Gastropods described in 1990